Danboro is an unincorporated community in Plumstead Township in Bucks County, Pennsylvania, United States. Danboro is located at the intersection of Ferry Road/Danboro Point Pleasant Pike and Old Easton Road, north of Doylestown.

References

Unincorporated communities in Bucks County, Pennsylvania
Unincorporated communities in Pennsylvania